Altenau (Bay) station is a railway station in the municipality of Saulgrub, in Bavaria, Germany. It is located on the Ammergau Railway of Deutsche Bahn.

Services
 the following services stop at Altenau (Bay):

References

External links
 
 Altenau (Bay) layout 
 

Railway stations in Bavaria
Buildings and structures in Garmisch-Partenkirchen (district)